The gathering of Iranians in Strasbourg, France, was held in front of the European Parliament on 16 January 2023 (26 Dey 1401), with the aim of declaring the Islamic Revolutionary Guard Corps as a terrorist organization by the European Union. Roberta Metsola, the head of this parliament, said to the Iranians: "You stand on the right side of history and you will make history, and we will not leave you alone".

The purpose of the demonstration 
This gathering is supposed to reflect the desire of a large number of Iranians for the IRGC to be "recognized as a terrorist" by Europe and the international community. Thousands of Iranians living in France and other European countries on Monday, January 26, traveled to Strasbourg in the northeast of France to gather in front of the headquarters of the European Parliament and demanded that the entire Islamic Revolutionary Guard Corps be called terrorists. Europe was called to take other decisive steps against the violence of the Islamic Republic of Iran against the protesters in recent months in Iran. This is the second largest gathering of Iranians in the last four months in Europe after the Berlin event to express solidarity with the protesters inside the country and also to invite the European authorities to Bringing stronger decisions against the Islamic Republic of Iran. Demonstrators had expressed their hope to create "another Berlin" with this event. Three months ago, about one hundred thousand Iranians from Europe and the world gathered in Berlin at the invitation of Hamed Esmailiyoun, author and spokesperson of the Association of Victims of the Downed Ukrainian Plane. The rally in Strasbourg came after more than a hundred members of the European Parliament signed a letter last week asking the European Union to take new steps against Tehran's rule. , supported the complete introduction of the IRGC as a terrorist organization. The gathering of Iranians was held on the eve of the parliament session, which is scheduled to discuss the situation in Iran and pass a resolution on Thursday, 29 January 1401. The European Parliament is the legislative body of the European Union consisting of 705 seats, whose members are from 27 EU member states. During the four months of Iranian people's protests, many members of this parliament took several measures to express solidarity with Iranians, including a number of women in the parliament, who cut their hair during the Iranian women's protests. A number of members of the European Parliament have also taken political guaranty for the detained protestors sentenced to death in Iran, which, although it is a symbolic act, is considered as political pressure on the Iranian government. Iranians have traveled to Strasbourg and proposed the expulsion of Iranian ambassadors from European Union countries and the return of these countries' ambassadors from Tehran. A number of representatives of the parliaments of European countries, who are of Iranian descent, supported the gathering of Iranians in Strasbourg and called on Iranians to attend this event. A day before the gathering of Iranians in Strasbourg, Prince Reza Pahlavi, Masih Ali Nejad, Ali Karimi, Golshifteh Farahani and Nazanin Fanadi in a joint tweet called on the countries of the world to call the entire IRGC a terrorist. In this joint tweet, it is stated: "For more than four decades, the IRGC has been terrorizing, suppressing and killing inside and outside Iran. The arms of the nation are open to those who have not committed a crime; If they join the people.

References 

Protests in Iran
Political repression in Iran
History of the Islamic Republic of Iran
September 2022 events in Iran
Women's rights in Iran
People killed in the Mahsa Amini protests
Iranian Sunni Muslims
Baloch people
Deaths by person in Iran